Soft contact lenses are one of several types of contact lenses for corrective vision eyewear as prescribed by optometrists and ophthalmologists.

Background 

In the US market, soft contact lenses are approved by the US Food and Drug Administration.  The American Optometric Association published a contact lens comparison chart called Advantages and Disadvantages of Various Types of Contact Lenses on the differences between them. These include:
 soft contact lenses
 rigid gas-permeable (RGP)
 daily wear 
 extended wear
 disposable  
 planned replacement contact lenses.

The US Food and Drug Administration (FDA) defines soft contact lenses as:

History
The first contact lenses were made of glass, in 1888.  Initially the glass was blown but soon lenses were made by being ground to shape. For the first fifty years, glass was the only material used.  The lenses were thin, yet reports of injury were rare.  In 1938 perspex (polymethylmethacrylate, or PMMA) began to replace glass in contact lens manufacture.  PMMA lenses were easier to produce so the production of glass lenses soon ended. Lenses made of PMMA are called hard lenses. Soft contact lenses were first produced in 1961 by Czech chemical engineer Otto Wichterle using polyhydroxyethylmethacrylate (pHEMA), a material that achieved long-term commercial application. Lenses made of polyacrylamide were introduced in 1971.

Types 
The FDA classifies soft contact lenses into four groups for the US market. They are also subcategorized into 1st generation, 2nd generation, and 3rd generation lens materials. These 'water-loving' soft contact lens materials are categorized as "Conventional Hydrophilic Material Groups ("-filcon"):

Note: Being ionic in pH = 6.0 - 8.0".
 
The FDA has been considering updating soft contact lens group types and related guidance literature.

Contact lens polymers 
The materials that are classified in the 5 FDA groups include the ones listed in the next 5 sections:

Hydrogel groups 
Below is a list of most contact lens materials on the market, their water percentage, their oxygen permeability rating, and manufacturer brands. Note that the higher the oxygen transmissibility rating, the more oxygen gets to the eye.

Low water nonionic

High water nonionic

Low Water ionic

High Water ionic

Silicone hydrogel polymers

Production generations
There are three generations of silicone hydrogel contact lens materials:

References

Contact lenses
Eye care in the United States
Medical equipment
Medical technology
Medical devices
Czech inventions